Platydemus manokwari, also known as the New Guinea flatworm, is a species of large predatory land flatworm.

Native to New Guinea, it has been accidentally introduced to the soil of many countries, including the United States. It was also deliberately introduced into two Pacific islands in an attempt to control an invasion of the Giant East African Snail. It eats a variety of invertebrates including land snails, and has had a significant negative impact on the rare endemic land snail fauna of some Pacific islands. It has become established in a wide variety of habitats.

General ecology

Description 
Both ends of the animal are pointed, but the head end is more pointed than the tail end. Near the tip of the head end are two eyes. It is dark brown on the upper surface, with a lighter central line. The underside is pale grey.

Natural habitat 
P. manokwari is native to the island of New Guinea in the Pacific Ocean. This species of large flatworm preys on land mollusks and has been categorized as one of the 100 worst invasive species. 

The original habitat of P. manokwari is within tropical areas, but it has been found in almost all temperate regions of the world including in agricultural, coastland, and disturbed areas, as well as, natural forests, planted forests, riparian zones, scrub/shrublands, urban areas, and wetlands. However, P. manokwari does not live in urban coastal areas, perhaps due to environmental factors, such as lack of vegetation.

Prey 

P. manokwari mainly preys on small land snails, but it has been known to feed on various soil invertebrates, such as earthworms, slugs, and arthropods. Platydemus manokwari is the main predator of land mollusks, and preys upon the snails during most of their life cycle including young hatchlings. Furthermore, P. manokwari does not recognize early-stage snail eggs as a possible food source, but it does feed on young hatchlings and late-stage eggs of land snails. Platydemus manokwari uses a chemical-based tracking method to follow snail mucus trails and track down its prey, sometimes even into trees. In areas where the land snail population has been exhausted, it has been known to eat other flatworms.
The diet of Platydemus manokwari is also affected seasonally. According to studies done by Sugiura, more than 90% of the land snails were preyed upon by P. manokwari in the period from July to November, and only 40% of the land snails were eaten during the other months. It was thus found that there was a positive correlation between snail mortality and temperature. This seasonal difference can be explained by different foraging behaviors, different microclimatic conditions, and different densities.

Predators 
There are no known predators of P. manokwari.  However, it is a paratenic host for the nematode Angiostrongylus cantonensis, also known as the rat lungworm.  This nematode parasitizes P. manokwari as well as the Giant African land snail, and both of these organisms are transmission vectors of the parasite.  A. cantonensis parasitizes humans as well and causes angiostrongyliasis.  P. manokwari is presumed to act as a transmission vector of the parasite to humans and affects the epidemiology of angiostrongyliasis.
In an outbreak of angiostrongyliasis in the Okinawa Prefecture, populations of Angiostrongylasis cantonensis intermediates were examined in order to find the most frequently infected intermediates.  P. manokwari was found to be one of the prevailing infected hosts, with an infection rate of 14.1%.  It is possible that Platydemus manokwari is a vector because it has been occasionally found underside cabbage leaves which would be eaten raw as fresh salad.

Invasive species characteristics 

Platydemus manokwari has been introduced to several tropical and subtropical islands such as Micronesia, the Marquesas, the Society Islands, Samoa, Melanesia, and the Hawaiian Islands. These islands often harbor endemic radiations of rare and endangered snail species, which are a primary source of nutrition for Platydemus manokwari. Platydemus manokwari has also been introduced to several Japanese Islands.
In 2015, P. manokwari was found in Puerto Rico and in Florida, from which it could invade South US mainland. In 2021, it was reported from the French islands of Guadeloupe, Martinique and Saint Martin in the Antilles.

Genetics
Two haplotypes of the Cytochrome c oxidase subunit I (a mitochondrial gene commonly used for DNA barcoding) sequence have been characterised for P. manokwari: one, named "World haplotype", has been found in France, New Caledonia, French Polynesia, Singapore, Florida and Puerto Rico; and the other, named "Australian haplotype" was found in Australia. The only locality with both haplotypes was in the Solomon Islands. These results suggest that two haplotypes exist in the area of origin of the species, probably Papua New Guinea, but that only one of the two haplotypes (the "World haplotype") has, through human agency, been widely dispersed. The complete mitochondrial genome, 19,959-bp in length, was obtained in 2020; it contains 36 genes and is almost colinear with the mitogenomes of the two other species previously sampled from the Geoplanidae, Bipalium kewense and Obama nungara; however, the mitogenome of Platydemus manokwari has an unusually large Cytochrome c oxidase subunit II gene.

References

Further reading 
 
 Muniappan R. (1990) "Use of the planarian, Platydemus manokwari, and other natural enemies to control the giant African snail". In: Bay-Petersen J. (ed.) The use of natural enemies to control agricultural pests. Food and Fertilizer Technology Center for the Asian and Pacific Region, Taipei, pp 179–183.

External links 

 Platydemus manokwari in ISSG database
 Platydemus manokwari on James Cook University, Australia website

Geoplanidae
Fauna of New Guinea
Animals described in 1963